The River Tyburn was a stream (bourn) in London, its main successor sewers emulate its main courses but it resembled the Colne in its county of Middlesex in that it had many distributaries (inland mouths).  It ran from South Hampstead, through Marylebone and Mayfair then ran through St James's parish/district and Green Park to meet the tidal Thames at four sites, grouped into pairs. These pairs were near Whitehall Stairs (east of Downing Street) and by Thorney Street, between Millbank Tower and Thames House. Its much smaller cousin the Tyburn Brook was a tributary of the Westbourne, in turn the next Thames tributary (west, on the north bank).

A charter of AD 959 appears to mention the river, which it refers to as Merfleot, which probably translates as Boundary Stream, a suggestion reinforced by context, with the river forming the western boundary of the estate described.

Course
Before it was culverted then utilized as a sewer this  brook rose from the confluence of two streams in the hills of South Hampstead, deriving from the broad ravine between Barrow and Primrose Hills. Its main source was the Shepherd's Well near Fitzjohn's Avenue, Hampstead. At Green Park the waters split into distributaries, creating Thorney Island on which Westminster Abbey was built. As the map shows, these again split in two, one in the then lower, thus typically Spring tide immersed bank, where Whitehall sits, the other close to Vincent Square, Pimlico, Westminster. The river's current path is fully enclosed by concrete, bricks, parks and roads, flowing through underground conduits for its entire length, including one beneath Buckingham Palace. Several streets, including Marylebone Lane, Jason Street, Gees Court, South Molton Lane then Bruton Lane, defy the grid system of streets as the streets follow the former path of the Tyburn on what was its left bank through Marylebone village. Most of its catchment drains into soakaways in gravel soil, in turn into the chalk water table beneath or into the two-type and hybrid type of drainage set out in Victorian London. In the Tyburn's depression run key (lateral) sewers which connect to Bazalgette's west-to-east Interceptor sewers. 

From its source at the Shepherd's Well near Fitzjohns Avenue in Hampstead its successor is Scholar's Pond Sewer southward along that avenue through the Swiss Cottage part of South Hampstead under Avenue Road to Regent's Park. To enter the park's perimeter the part-foul (combined) run is carried enpiped over the Regent's Canal then culverted.

The Tyburn gave its name to the former area of Tyburn, a manor of Marylebone, which was recorded in Domesday Book and which stood approximately at the west end of what is now Oxford Street, where from late medieval times until the 18th century traitors were left following hanging at Tyburn Gallows.  Tyburn gave its name to the predecessors of Oxford Street and Park Lane—Tyburn Road and Tyburn Lane respectively.

Grays Antique Centre near the junction of Oxford Street and Davies Street claims that the body of water which can be seen in an open conduit in the basement of its premises is part of the Tyburn; it is undoubtedly close to the culverted course of the stream. The Londonist website describes this suggestion as "fanciful", as the modern Tyburn is a sewer.

The stream's southward route followed Lansdowne Row, the north-east of Curzon Street then White Horse Street and the pedestrian avenue of Green Park to the front gates of Buckingham Palace (foot of Constitution Hill) from where one mouth used the depression of St James's Park Lake and Downing Street to reach two close-paired mouths. A third distributary is untraced in the building lines and street layout to Thorney Street close to Lambeth Bridge, whilst a fourth distributary forms the natural collect for a  sewer pipe, King's Scholar's Pond Sewer, to the Victoria Embankment interceptor, saving it from discharging west of Vauxhall Bridge.

See also
 Tributaries of the River Thames
 Subterranean rivers of London
 List of rivers in England

References

External links

Subterranean rivers of London
Geography of the City of Westminster
1Tyburn